The Bureau, Secretariat and Orgburo of the 7th Congress of the Russian Communist Party (Bolsheviks) were elected by a Session of the 7th Central Committee in the immediate aftermath of the 7th Congress. The 7th Orgburo was elected by the twenty-fourth session of the 7th Central Committee, held on 16 January 1919.

7th Bureau

7th Secretariat

7th Orgburo

References

Politburo of the Central Committee of the Communist Party of the Soviet Union members
Secretariat of the Central Committee of the Communist Party of the Soviet Union members
Members of the Orgburo of the Central Committee of the Communist Party of the Soviet Union
Politburo
Politburo
Politburo
Politburo